The following is a list of Nippon Professional Baseball pitchers who have recorded at least 2,000 strikeouts. In baseball, a strikeout occurs when the batter receives three strikes during his time at bat. Strikeouts are associated with dominance on the part of the pitcher and failure on the part of the batter.

Masaichi Kaneda has the most career strikeouts in Nippon Professional Baseball. During a 19-year career, he struck out 4,490 batters.

The List

A player is considered "inactive" if he has not played baseball for one year or has announced his retirement.
Stats updated as of the end of 2015 season.

References

See also
 List of Major League Baseball career strikeout leaders

Nippon Professional Baseball